OSQ may refer to:
Orchestre Symphonique de Québec, Canadian orchestra
Original Sound Quality, audio file format
Olympique Saint-Quentin, French football team